Ralstonia is a genus of bacteria, previously included in the genus Pseudomonas. It is named after the American bacteriologist Ericka Ralston. Ericka Ralston was born Ericka Barrett in 1944 in Saratoga, California, and died in 2015 in Sebastopol, California. While in graduate school at the University of California at Berkeley, she identified 20 strains of Pseudomonas which formed a phenotypical homologous group, and named them Pseudomonas pickettii, after M.J. Pickett in the Department of Bacteriology at the University of California at Los Angeles, from whom she had received the strains. Later, P. pickettii was transferred to the new genus Ralstonia, along with several other species. She continued her research into bacterial pathogenesis under the name of Ericka Barrett while a professor of microbiology at the University of California at Davis from 1977 until her retirement in 1996.

Genomics
Ralstonia Genome Projects (from Genomes OnLine Database)
Comparative Analysis of Ralstonia Genomes (at DOE's IMG system)

Ralstonia has also been identified as a common contaminant of DNA extraction kit or PCR reagents, which may lead to its erroneous appearance in microbiota or metagenomic datasets. Ralstonia is one of the most common pathogens for causing nosocomial infections in immunocompromised patients. Those receiving mechanical ventilation are twelve times more likely of developing the infection than those not on a mechanical vent.

Ecology
Ralstonia has been identified in the milk of water deer, reindeer and goats. Ralstonia pickettii, Ralstonia insidiosa and Ralstonia mannitolilytica have been found in many different environments including in clinical situations where they can act as pathogens.

References

Burkholderiaceae
Bacteria genera